HU-320 (7-nor-7-carboxy-CBD-1,1-DMH) is a drug related to cannabidiol, which has strong antiinflammatory and immunosuppressive properties while demonstrating no psychoactive effects.

See also
 7-Hydroxycannabidiol
 Ajulemic acid
 HU-210
 HU-308
 HU-331

References

HU cannabinoids
Cyclohexenes
2,6-Dihydroxybiphenyls